"Hot Demon Bitches Near U!!!" (styled as HOT DEMON B!TCHES NEAR U! ! !) is a song by YouTuber Corpse Husband, also known as Corpse, featuring Canadian rapper Night Lovell, that was released on September 3, 2021.

Background and composition 
The 1-minute-35-second song is 100 beats per minute. In the lyrics are references to British content service OnlyFans, Japanese manga series Devilman, and "Trip 6." The lyric "How you get a plaque while independent? It was in the plan," is a reference to him receiving an RIAA Gold plaque for his single "E-Girls Are Ruining My Life!" despite being an independent artist.

Corpse revealed the song in his birthday Twitch stream and promoted it numerous other times on Twitter throughout August. It has also been promoted by fellow internet personalities Emma Langevin, Valkyrae, and Sykkuno, and received positive reception from fans on Twitter.

Reception 
On the Billboard week of September 18, 2021, "Hot Demon Bitches Near U!!!" entered the Bubbling Under Hot 100 chart at number thirteen, only being blocked from a Hot 100 debut by a Drake album. It also entered the UK Singles chart at number eighty-six, and Global 200 at number one hundred ninety-five.

Charts

References 

2021 songs
2021 singles